UFC Fight Night: Stout vs. Fisher (also known as UFC Fight Night 10) was a mixed martial arts event held by the Ultimate Fighting Championship on Tuesday, June 12, 2007, at the Seminole Hard Rock Hotel and Casino in Hollywood, Florida.

Background
This event was broadcast live in the United States and Canada on Spike TV.

The main event featured lightweights Sam Stout and Spencer Fisher in a rematch from their first fight at UFC 58: USA vs. Canada, which Stout won by split decision. Fisher had accepted that match on very short notice and was forced to lose a considerable amount of weight – in the range of 20 pounds – in order to make the lightweight limit of 155 lb (70 kg).

The event drew a 1.2 rating, collecting 1.6 million television viewers, according to Nielson Media Research.

Results

Bonus awards

The bonuses for this event were $30,000 each.

Fight of the Night: Sam Stout vs. Spencer Fisher
Knockout of the Night: Drew McFedries
Submission of the Night: Thiago Tavares

See also
 Ultimate Fighting Championship
 List of UFC champions
 List of UFC events
 2007 in UFC

References

UFC Fight Night
2007 in mixed martial arts
Mixed martial arts in Florida
Sports in Hollywood, Florida
2007 in sports in Florida
Events in Hollywood, Florida